Helloween are a German power metal band from Hamburg. Formed in 1984, the group was originally a quartet featuring Kai Hansen on lead vocals and rhythm guitar, Michael Weikath on lead guitar and backing vocals, Markus Grosskopf on bass and backing vocals, and Ingo Schwichtenberg on drums. The band's current lineup includes constant members Weikath and Grosskopf, alongside Hansen (who rejoined in 2016 after leaving in 1989), co-lead vocalists Michael Kiske (from 1986 to 1993, and since 2016) and Andreas "Andi" Deris (since 1994), rhythm guitarist and backing vocalist Sascha Gerstner (since 2002), and drummer Daniel "Dani" Löble (since 2005).

History

1984–1994 
Helloween were formed in 1984 by Kai Hansen, Michael Weikath, Markus Grosskopf and Ingo Schwichtenberg. The band signed with German heavy metal label Noise Records before the end of the year and released their self-titled debut EP in April 1985. After the group issued their debut full-length album Walls of Jericho later the same year, Hansen decided to step back from the role of lead vocalist to focus on his guitar playing. After a lengthy process of trying to find a replacement, in November the role was filled by Michael Kiske. Keeper of the Seven Keys: Parts I and II followed in 1987 and 1988, respectively, before Hansen left completely on New Year's Day 1989 due to "the ever-increasing stress of touring". He was quickly replaced by Roland Grapow and the band returned to touring.

With new guitarist Roland Grapow, the band released two studio albums – Pink Bubbles Go Ape in 1991 and Chameleon in 1993 – before more lineup changes occurred. During the 1993 tour in promotion of Chameleon, Schwichtenberg was fired due to drug addiction and mental health issues, with Riad "Ritchie" Abdel-Nabi taking his place for the rest of the shows. By the end of the year, Kiske had also been fired after growing tensions between the two members had led Weikath to refuse to work with the vocalist. Schwichtenberg would later commit suicide in 1995.

1994–2003 
After firing two members in late 1993, Helloween returned early the following year with new vocalist Andreas "Andi" Deris and drummer Ulrich "Uli" Kusch. This lineup remained stable for several years, issuing a string of commercially successful albums. However, in August 2001 it was announced that both Kusch and guitarist Roland Grapow had parted ways with Helloween. In a statement issued the day after the official announcement, the dismissals were credited to "differences in priority", with a spokesman for the band adding that "It was felt Roland and Uli were paying too much time and attention to their solo projects. After a very successful tour behind The Dark Ride album Michael, Markus and Andi felt quite rightly that the focus of Helloween members must be 100% on Helloween."

In early September, Kusch's replacement was announced as former Metalium drummer Mark Cross. Helloween remained without a second guitarist until August 2002, when it was announced that Sascha Gerstner, who had left Freedom Call a year earlier, had joined the band. Recording subsequently began for the group's next album, however Cross was forced to sit out after contracting mononucleosis, with Mikkey Dee of Motörhead taking his place in the studio. In February 2003, Cross was officially replaced by former U.D.O. and Accept drummer Stefan Schwarzmann.

Since 2003 
Within two years of joining, drummer Stefan Schwarzmann had left Helloween, with Daniel "Dani" Löble taking his place in February 2005. The lineup remained stable for more than ten years, before it was announced in November 2016 that founding member Kai Hansen and former vocalist Michael Kiske would be returning to Helloween for the Pumpkins United World Tour starting the following year. At the start of the tour, the newly expanded group released the single "Pumpkins United", featuring Kiske, Hansen and continuing vocalist Andi Deris on vocals. Following the touring cycle, the seven-piece incarnation of Helloween remained in place, with a new studio album slated for release in 2020.

Official members

Current

Former

Backup musicians

Session

Touring

Timeline

Lineups

References

External links 
Helloween official website

Helloween